QRE can be an abbreviation for:
 Quantal response equilibrium (game-theoretic term)
 Quantified Regular Expression
 Quick Reaction Element (military term)
 Query and Reporting Environment
 Quick Response Engine
 Queens Road Elite
 Quasi-Reference Electrode
 Qualified Revolving Exposure (banking term)
 Qualified Restoration (or Rehabilitation) Expenses (tax term)
 (short for) Questionnaire (market research term)